Llamachayuq Qaqa (Quechua llama llama, -cha, -yuq suffixes, qaqa rock, "a rock with a little llama"), Wakan Wayq'u or Wakanwayq'u (Waqhan Wayq'o, Waqhanhuayq'o, Waqhanwayq'o) is an archaeological site with rock paintings in Peru. It is situated in the Cusco Region, Canchis Province, Combapata District.

East of Llamachayuq Qaqa there is another site with rock art named Ayamach'ay.

References 

Rock art in South America
Archaeological sites in Peru
Archaeological sites in Cusco Region